Yerco Abraham Oyanedel Hernández (born 19 September 2000) is a Chilean professional footballer who plays as a left-back for Chilean club Cobresal.

Club career

Universidad Catolica
Oyanedel debuted the year 2019 in the match against Union la Calera in Calera, on the following date.

International career
At early age, he represented Chile at under-15 level at the 2015 South American U-15 Championship and winning the friendly 2015 Aspire Tri-Series International Tournament in Doha, Qatar. At under-17 level, he represented Chile at two friendly matches against USA U17, at the 2017 South American U-17 Championship – Chile was the runner-up – and at the 2017 FIFA U-17 World Cup. Also, he played all the matches for Chile U17 at the friendly tournament Lafarge Foot Avenir 2017 in France, better known as Tournament Limoges, where Chile became champion after defeating Belgium U18 and Poland U18 and drawing France U18.

Career statistics

Club

Honours

Club
Universidad Católica
 Primera División (2): 2018, 2019
 Supercopa de Chile (1): 2019
 Friendlies (1): Torneo de Verano Fox Sports 2019

International
Chile U15
 Aspire Tri-Series International Tournament: 2015

Chile U17
Tournoi de Limoges: 2017

References

External links
 
 
 Yerco Oyanedel at playmakerstats.com (English version of ceroacero.es)

2000 births
Living people
People from Santiago
People from Santiago Province, Chile
People from Santiago Metropolitan Region
Footballers from Santiago
Chilean footballers
Chile youth international footballers
Chilean Primera División players
Primera B de Chile players
Club Deportivo Universidad Católica footballers
Rangers de Talca footballers
Unión La Calera footballers
Association football defenders